Piccadilly is a small village in the North Warwickshire district of the county of Warwickshire in England. It is located near to the larger village of Kingsbury (where population details are included), and is four miles south of Tamworth.

History

Piccadilly was built in 1904 to house miners who worked at the nearby Kingsbury Colliery, and the village was built on land belonging to the mine. It consisted of two rows of three-storey houses along one main street.

Piccadilly earned its name from Piccadilly in London, which was the home of Colonel Dibley, one of the village's founders. Dibley asked the miners what they would like to call their new village, but when nobody could think of an appropriate name, he chose Piccadilly.

In 1908 a clubhouse was built. It had been turned into a pub named The Jewel in the Crown but this has now been demolished and social housing built.

The village remained much the same until 1947 when prefabricated housing was built to house more mineworkers. These were demolished in the early 1960s after which the local authority of the time, Tamworth Rural District Council, used the land to build council houses. These remain to the present day.

The mine was closed in 1968 and is now the Kingsbury link Business park.

Miners Memorial Wall

In 2009 a memorial wall was built containing the names of all the miners who worked at Kingsbury Colliery and Dexter Colliery. In the center of the wall there is a miner's lamp that is always lit to commemorate those who have died and those who remember working down the mines.

Demographics
According to the 2001 Census the population of the Hurley and Wood End ward was 3,642. Over 99.5% of people (3,550) describe themselves as White British with only 89 people from other ethnic groups. The Ward almost has an almost exact 50:50 split of males and females, with a ratio of 1,822 to 1,820 respectively. According to Kingsbury Parish Council there are 142 houses in the village.

Governance
The village is part of the Kingsbury civil parish.

The village was originally part of the Tamworth Rural District from its creation, until 1965 when it became part of the Atherstone Rural District. In 1974 under the Local Government Act 1972 it became part of the newly formed district of North Warwickshire. Inside North Warwickshire it is part of the Hurley and Wood End Ward, and because of the mining connection the village often elects Labour councillors.

It is part of the North Warwickshire constituency and the current MP is Conservative Craig Tracey.

Crime
In 2009 there was an average of 3.6 crimes per 1,000 people for the ward of Hurley and Wood End, and during the same period there were 5 crimes per head for the borough of North Warwickshire. In 2010 the figure was down to 3 crimes per head. The most common type of crime is anti-social behaviour.

Recreation
The village has a large cricket field and play area. The nearest village hall is in Wood End

Education
There has never been any educational institution in the village. The nearest primary school is Wood End Primary School, and the nearest comprehensive school is Kingsbury School. In terms of further education, the area is served by North Warwickshire and Hinckley College at Nuneaton. There is also Tamworth and Lichfield College.

Health
The nearest GP's surgeries can be found in Kingsbury and Hurley. The George Eliot Hospital at Nuneaton is the area's local hospital. It has an Accident and Emergency Department. Out-of-hours GP services are also based at George Eliot. There is also Good Hope Hospital in Sutton Coldfield.

Public services
The village uses a Birmingham (B) Postcode unlike Wood End which uses a Coventry (CV) post code, The postal town is Tamworth which makes it often written as being part of Staffordshire despite being in Warwickshire. Water and sewage services are provided by Severn Trent Water.

The nearest Warwickshire Police and Warwickshire Fire and Rescue stations are in Atherstone.

Religion
There has never been any place of worship in the village, which technically makes it a hamlet. The nearest place of worship is St Michael & All Angels Church in Wood End. The Parish Church of St Peter & St Paul is also located close by at Kingsbury. Both of these are Church of England churches. Piccadilly also falls into the Roman Catholic Parish of St. John The Baptist, with the main collegiate church being St. John's Presbytery in Tamworth.

Transport
The village lies next to the M42 motorway, with the nearest exit being at Junction 10.

The village has a bus stop on Trinity Road which is served by Route 118, which connects Piccadilly to Kingsbury and Tamworth. A new shelter was provided by Kingsbury Parish Council in November 2007. The nearest railway station is at Wilnecote. But Water Orton and Coleshill Parkway are also a short distance away from the village.

Media
The local newspaper covering the area is the Tamworth Herald.

Local radio includes BBC Coventry & Warwickshire, Free Coventry & Warwickshire and Capital Mid-Counties.

The village is covered by the Central ITV and BBC West Midlands TV regions broadcast from the nearby Sutton Coldfield transmitting station.

References

External links

Villages in Warwickshire
Kingsbury, Warwickshire
1904 establishments in England